Prince Earl Rouse, Jr. (October 12, 1917 – August 10, 2003) was an American physical chemist. He received his PhD from the University of Illinois in 1941.

Rouse is most famous for a 1953 publication in which he introduced what is now known as the Rouse model of polymer dynamics. He was awarded the Bingham Medal in 1966 by the Society of Rheology.

References

1917 births
2003 deaths
American physical chemists
Polymer physics
Polymer scientists and engineers